Joseph Ferdinand may refer to:

 Joseph Ferdinand of Bavaria (1692–1699)
 Archduke Joseph Ferdinand of Austria (1872–1942)
 Joseph Ferdinand Damberger (1795–1859), historian of the Catholic Church
 Joseph F. Wingate (1786–?), American politician

Masculine given names